Rusk Independent School District is a public school district based in Rusk, Texas (USA).

The district serves the cities of Rusk, Gallatin and Reklaw, rural areas in central Cherokee County (including Maydelle) and a small portion of southwestern Rusk County.

In 2009, the school district was rated "academically acceptable" by the Texas Education Agency.

On July 1, 1985, portions of the McAdoo Independent School District were incorporated into Rusk ISD. On July 1, 1989, the Maydelle Independent School District merged into Rusk ISD.

Schools
Rusk High School (Grades 9–12)
Rusk Junior High School (Grades 6–8)
Rusk Intermediate School (Grades 4–5)
Rusk Elementary School (Grades 2–3)
Rusk Primary School (Grades PK–1)

References

External links
Rusk ISD

School districts in Cherokee County, Texas
School districts in Rusk County, Texas